Die Aula was a far-right Austrian magazine. It was started as monthly, but later became a bi-monthly magazine. The magazine existed between 1951 and June 2018.

History and profile
Die Aula was established in 1951. It was owned by the FAV Association of Academics. Its publisher was the Aula-Verlag in Graz. In the initial stage it was monthly, but later was made bi-monthly.

The magazine was the mouthpiece of the National-Liberal Students' Association of Austria. It had close links to Freedom Party of Austria (FPÖ).

Die Aula was last published in June 2018.

See also
List of magazines in Austria

References

1951 establishments in Austria
2018 disestablishments in Austria
Bi-monthly magazines
Defunct magazines published in Austria
Defunct political magazines
German-language magazines
German nationalism in Austria
Magazines established in 1951
Magazines disestablished in 2018
Mass media in Graz
Monthly magazines published in Austria
Neo-Nazi publications